Celastrina gigas, the silvery hedge blue, is a small butterfly found in India that belongs to the lycaenids or blues family. The species was first described by Francis Hemming in 1928.

Taxonomy
The species is considered to consist of the following subspecies:
 C. g. gigas – nominate subspecies
 C. g. fujianensis Huang, 1994 Fujian

Range
It is found in the West Himalaya.

See also
List of butterflies of India
List of butterflies of India (Lycaenidae)

References

Celastrina
Butterflies of Asia
Butterflies described in 1928